Kazancı Holding is a conglomerate headquartered in Turkey with companies in agriculture, tourism and energy; most under the Aksa name. It owns various power stations via AKSA Power Generation. The hotels are branded Mirada. It is in the Fortune 500 for Turkey.

Aksa Energy exports to Iraq and Georgia and made a profit of 208 million lira (23 million dollars) in the first quarter of 2021.

References 

Holding companies of Turkey